Murray Hill Hotel  was located on Murray Isle in the Thousand Islands region of the St. Lawrence River in the U.S. state of New York. Built in 1895, and closed in 1915, it could accommodate 500 guests.

History

The hotel was initially owned by Amasa Corbin Jr. of Gouverneur and Capt. James “Jack” Taylor. A seasonal hotel, it was open from May to September for 20 years. Although the hotel had modern amenities, the various lessees led to a failing enterprise. In 1912, it was sold to the Republic Trust Company of Dallas, Texas, but it closed three years later, and was demolished in 1942.

Architecture and fittings

The hotel was constructed in 1895 at a cost of US$100,000. It measured  in length and four stories in height. The wraparound porch measured . It was equipped with electric lights and electric calls, billiard parlors, bowling alleys, elevator and fireplaces. It had what was advertised at one time as the largest dining-room, largest parlor, largest office, largest ladies' billiard-room, and longest and widest piazza of any hotel of the Adirondacks or Thousand Islands. Rates were $3.00 and $4.00 per day.

Grounds
The hotel was situated on Eel Bay, and advertised fishing opportunities on the St. Lawrence River. Boating and sailing were also available.

References

Bibliography

Hotels established in 1895
Thousand Islands
Demolished hotels in the United States
Defunct hotels in New York (state)
Hotels disestablished in 1915
Buildings and structures demolished in 1942
1895 establishments in New York (state)
Demolished buildings and structures in New York (state)